Aeterna is a Russian fantasy TV series based on a series of novels by Vera Kamsha 'Reflections of Aeterna'. The project is being produced by Black Prince. The premiere of the show took place on 20 January 2022 in the online cinema Kinopoisk. The sequel is scheduled for a 2023 release.

Plot 
Kertiana, the world created by the four Gods, flourished under their rule for a thousand years. Four left this world and bequeathed to keep Kertiana to their heirs: King Rakan and four Lords. Every 400 years, the time of the Great Break comes, and only Rakan and the Lords keep the world from destruction. Thousands of years have passed, and the Gods have not returned. Rakan and the lords forgot their purpose, and troubled times fell on Karthian. At the turn of the eras, Ollar the Conqueror goes to war against King Rakan. The conqueror is supported by the Lord of the Wind and opens the gates of the impregnable capital. The King's heir is rescued by the Lord of the Rocks, sheltering him from the holy city of Agaris. 400 years of Rakani in exile, and usurpers on the royal throne. But the legend says: the powers of the Ollars will last 400 years. And now the Lord of the Rocks Oakdell raises a rebellion, but dies from the sword of the Lord of the Wind Alva. Deprived of their leader, the rebels flee. And only the clan of the Lord of Lightning Epine protects the retreating army. Everyone dies in battle, except for the younger Robert.

Actors and roles

Starring

Minor roles

Production 
The start of work on the project began in September 2020. The series was produced by Evgeny Baranov and Evgeny Rene, with creative producers Nikita Sugakov and Vladislav Rubin. The director of the first part is Evgeny Nevsky and the screenwriters are Sergey Yudakov and Evgent Baranov. The production designer is Anastasia Karimulina and the cameraman is Alexander Simonov and Antoine Vivas - Denisov. The Black Prince company was created especially for filming the series. In 2019, a teaser for the series was filmed in Moscow.

The producer of the series, Yevgeny Baranov and Yevgeny Rene, planned to shoot five seasons with 10 episodes each.

Filming of the first part took place in Moscow and St. Petersburg.

References 

Russian television series
Russian adventure television series
Russian fantasy television series